This is a list of seasons played by Sheffield United Football Club from 1889 (when Sheffield United first competed in the FA Cup) to the present day. It details the club's achievements in major competitions, and the top scorers for each season.

Seasons

Key

Pld = Matches played
W = Matches won
D = Matches drawn
L = Matches lost
GF = Goals for
GA = Goals against
Pts = Points
Pos = Final position
N/A = Not applicable
GS = Group stage
R1 = Round 1
R2 = Round 2
R3 = Round 3
R4 = Round 4
R5 = Round 5
QF = Quarter-finals 
SF = Semi-finals
RU = Runners-up
W = Winners

Note: Bold text indicates a competition won.
Note 2: Where fields are left blank, the club did not participate in a competition that season.

Notes

References
General

 Clarebrough & Kirkham (2012), Sheffield United: The Complete Record.'' The Derby Books Publishing Company Limited.
 English National Football Archive (subscription required)
 Soccerbase
Specific

External links
Sheffield United Official Website
United on the BBC
Club stats on BBC
FCHD Stats

Seasons
 
Sheffield United